Luge at the 1980 Winter Olympics consisted of three events at Mt. Van Hoevenberg Olympic Bobsled Run.  The competition took place between 13 and 16 February 1980.

Medal summary

Medal table

East Germany led the medal table with three medals, two gold.

Events

Participating NOCs
Fourteen nations participated in Luge at the Lake Placid Games. Romania made their Olympic luge debut.

References

 
1980
1980 Winter Olympics events
1980 in luge